The Eden of Coronet is a customized Gibson SG guitar, made with 18-karat white gold and studded with 11,441 diamonds. Commissioned in 2015, it was described by Guinness World Records as the world's "most valuable guitar" at the time, valued at US$2 million.

Background 
The Eden of Coronet was commissioned by the Hong Kong–based Aaron Shum Jewelry for its brand Coronet, in cooperation with Gibson. The design was laid on top of a Gibson SG model. Gibson collaborated with jewelry designer Aaron Shum and musician Mark Lui to create the guitar, with diamonds provided by the Hong Kong firm Chow Tai Fook. The guitar is playable.

The guitar was originally presented and displayed at the Marina Mall in Abu Dhabi for the 2015 Baselworld Watch and Jewellery Show, and was later displayed in China. It returned to Abu Dhabi in October 2019 and was again displayed at Baselworld. 

The Eden of Coronet was valued at US$2 million in 2015, at that time making it the most expensive guitar in the world. The record has since been broken several times.

Design 
The body of the guitar is covered in white gold and studded with diamonds arranged in shapes of flowers and other nature-oriented details. The guitar was named Eden because of its nature-inspired motifs. 

It features chrome hardware, including two Humbucker pickups with chrome covers. The guitar's tone controls are hidden beneath a layer of diamonds.

See also 
List of guitars

References

External links 
 Eden of Coronet – Musikmesse 2015
 Guinness World Records
 Video of the guitar's unveiling
 

Individual guitars
Electric guitars
Gibson SG